Guillemont is a commune approximately  east of Albert in the Somme department in Hauts-de-France in northern France.

It, like much of the surrounding area, is primarily an agricultural community, but is known for its large Commonwealth War Graves cemetery, which has many visitors.  The cemetery began as a field graveyard after the Battle of Guillemont, but was quickly expanded after the Armistice when graves from surrounding areas were centralized here.

In World War I, Guillemont was one of several important strategic areas controlled by Germans that effectively divided Allied forces.  It was changed hands several times during the war, before being finally taken and held by the British 20th (Light) Division and the 47th Brigade of the 16th (Irish) Division

Notable burials
Raymond Asquith (1916)
Edward Tennant (1916)

See also
Communes of the Somme department

References

Communes of Somme (department)